Le passe-muraille (French: The Walker-Through-Walls), also known as Chambre sensorielle, is the name of a bronze sculpture created in 2006 by French sculptor Jean-Bernard Métais. It is located in the "Parc du Pescatore" in Luxembourg City and was set up over the old casemate-network of the city.

The sculpture is made out of two bronze hemispheres; it is 3 meters high and has a diameter of 6 meters. One can enter Le Passe-muraille through these hemispheres. 8,000 holes let the landscape shine through.

Le passe-mureille was inaugurated on December 24, 2006, in the presence of Andrée Putman, Paul Helminger (mayor) and other notable guests.

It does not carry the signature of the artist.

References

External links
 Article on exporevue.com
 Article about "Le passe-muraille" on the artist's homepage

2006 sculptures
Outdoor sculptures
Culture in Luxembourg City
Bronze sculptures in Luxembourg